Athletics at the 1996 Summer Paralympics consisted of 210 events, 155 for men and 55 for women.

Participating nations

Medal summary

Medal table

Men's events

Women's events

References 

 

 
1996 Summer Paralympics events
1996
Paralympics